Troitsko-Khartsyzsk is an urban-type settlement in Khartsyzk Municipality, Donetsk Raion of Donetsk Oblast in eastern Ukraine. Population:

Demographics
Native language as of the Ukrainian Census of 2001:
 Ukrainian 34.46%
 Russian 65.54%

References

Urban-type settlements in Donetsk Raion